The Far 3 kpc Arm was discovered in 2008 by astronomer Tom Dame (Center for Astrophysics  Harvard & Smithsonian), while preparing a talk on the galaxy's spiral arms for a meeting of the 212th American Astronomical Society. Along with the Near 3 kpc Arm, the existence of which has been known since the mid-1950s, the counterpart inner arms establish our Galaxy's simple symmetry.

Tom Dame and collaborator Patrick Thaddeus analyzed data obtained using a 1.2-meter-diameter millimeter-wave telescope located at Cerro Tololo Inter-American Observatory (CTIO) in Chile. They detected the presence of the spiral arm in a CO survey and later confirmed their discovery using 21-centimeter radio measurements of atomic hydrogen collected by colleagues in Australia.

See also
Galactic disc

References

Milky Way arms
Galactic astronomy
Spiral galaxies